Jeff Durkota (December 20, 1923 – March 5, 2013) was an American football fullback and linebacker. He played for the Los Angeles Dons in 1948.

He died on March 5, 2013, in Lancaster, Pennsylvania at age 89.

References

1923 births
2013 deaths
American football fullbacks
American football linebackers
Penn State Nittany Lions football players
Los Angeles Dons players